Subirats is a municipality in the comarca of Alt Penedès, Catalonia, Spain. It is a lightly populated wine-producing area.

It includes the villages of:

References

External links
 Government data pages 

Municipalities in Alt Penedès